Ainsley Melham (born 2 December 1991) is an Australian actor, best known as a former member of Australian children's musical group Hi-5, and for playing the title role in Disney's Aladdin in Australia, and later on Broadway.

Career
Ainsley Melham was born in Australia on 2 December 1991, and raised in Bathurst with his sister Nadia. He graduated from Western Australian Academy of Performing Arts (WAAPA), graduating in 2012. He was also educated at the NIDA Open Program, the Australasian Tap Dance Academy and La Belle School of Dance. At WAAPA, Melham performed in a range of musicals, including Ragtime, Violet, Crazy For You, A Chorus Line, Xanadu, How To Succeed in Business Without Really Trying, and Into The Woods.

In January 2013, Melham joined the Australian children's musical group Hi-5 as part of a new generation, after successfully auditioning in late 2012. He starred in the documentary style cinematic release, Some Kind of Wonderful, which depicted the audition process, and appeared in three television series of Hi-5 House. After touring nationally and internationally for three years, Melham departed from the group in January 2016. He stated that he felt it was time to transition back into his theatre roots after "an incredible experience" with Hi-5.

In March 2016, Melham starred as Sonny Malone in an Australian musical production of Xanadu for Matthew Management and Hayes Theatre Co. Later in 2016, he was cast as the title role in Disney Theatrical Company's production of Aladdin in Sydney, Australia. He starred as the title character, Aladdin, and was nominated for a Helpmann Award for Best Male Actor in a Musical. After departing from the Australian cast in late 2018, it was announced that Melham would star in the Broadway production of Aladdin from 19 February 2019 at New Amsterdam Theatre. He rejoined Michael James Scott as Genie, and Arielle Jacobs as Princess Jasmine, the trio who formed the original Australian cast.

In November 2020, Melham played the title role in Pippin at the Sydney Lyric Theatre and in 2022 he will play the role of Prince Topher in Rodgers + Hammerstein's Cinderella at both the Sydney Lyric and Regent Theatre, Melbourne.

Theatre credits

Filmography

Awards and nominations

Notes

References

Australian male stage actors
Living people
1991 births
Australian gay actors
Australian people of Lebanese descent
Australian people of Italian descent
Australian children's musicians
Australian male musical theatre actors
21st-century LGBT people